Semicarbazide is the chemical compound with the formula OC(NH2)(N2H3). It is a water-soluble white solid. It is a derivative of urea.

Synthesis
The compound prepared by treating urea with hydrazine: 
OC(NH2)2  +  N2H4   →    OC(NH2)(N2H3)  +  NH3
A further reaction can occur to give carbohydrazide:
OC(NH2)(N2H3)  +  N2H4   →    OC(N2H3)2  +  NH3

Derivatives
Semicarbazide is frequently reacted with aldehydes and ketones to produce semicarbazones via a condensation reaction.  This is an example of imine formation resulting from the reaction of a primary amine with a carbonyl group.  The reaction is useful because semicarbazones, like oximes and 2,4-DNPs, typically have high melting points and crystallize, facilitating purification or identification of reaction products.

Properties
Semicarbazide products (semicarbazones and thiosemicarbazones) are known to have an activity of antiviral, antiinfective and antineoplastic through binding to copper or iron in cells.

Uses, occurrence, detection
Semicarbazide is used in preparing pharmaceuticals including nitrofuran antibacterials (furazolidone, nitrofurazone, nitrofurantoin) and related compounds.  It is also a product of degradations of the blowing agent azodicarbonamide (ADC).  Semicarbazide forms in heat-treated flour containing ADC as well as breads made from ADC-treated flour.

Semicarbazide is used as a detection reagent in thin layer chromatography (TLC). Semicarbazide stains α-keto acids on the TLC plate, which can then be viewed under ultraviolet light.

See also 
 Biurea - another product of reaction of urea with hydrazine
 Carbazide - structurally related with the general formula (R2NNH)2C(O)
 Semicarbazide-cadmium therapy
 thiosemicarbazide

References

External links 
 Compounds Containing a N-CO-N-N or More Complex Group

Functional groups
Photographic chemicals
 
Glutamate decarboxylase inhibitors